Nam Ji-hyun ( on January 9, 1990) is a South Korean actress and former singer. She is best known as the former leader and a vocalist of now-disbanded South Korean girl group 4Minute.

Early life 
Nam Ji-hyun was born on January 9, 1990 in Incheon, South Korea. Jihyun auditioned for  JYP Entertainment but was eliminated. However, she then joined Cube Entertainment as a result of Cube Entertainment's founder, Hong Seung-sung, being recommended by JYP's recruitment department in finding members to form 4Minute.

On February 24, 2015, she graduated from Sangmyung University receiving a degree in Contemporary Ballet and a lifetime achievement award at the university's graduation ceremony.

Career

2009–2014: Debut and solo activities

Ji-hyun was chosen as a member of 4Minute in 2009. The 5-member girl group officially debuted on June 18, 2009 with performing their debut single "Hot Issue" on M Countdown.

In 2010, Ji-hyun made her acting debut in the television series It's Okay, Daddy's Girl, playing a law student.

In 2011, Ji-hyun was cast in MBC's weekend drama A Thousand Kisses, playing the younger sister of Ryu Jin.

In February 2013 Ji-hyun was cast in the idol version of Love and War 2, a sitcom which creates reenactments of the problems and issues a couple may face in their marriage.
In October, Ji-hyun was cast in her first lead role in the mobile drama Please Remember, Princess.

In April 2014, Ji-hyun was cast in KBS' teen drama High School. However, she dropped out of the drama due to her overseas schedules conflicts. In September, Ji-hyun was cast in the web drama Love Cells. The same year, she starred in the anthology film The Youth.

In 2015, Ji-hyun starred in the 5-episode web drama Never Die.

2016–present: 4Minute's disbandment, acting career
On June 13, 2016, Cube Entertainment announced that 4Minute has disbanded and the members are still in discussion to renew their contracts. On June 15, Cube Entertainment officially announced that Jihyun, Gayoon, Jiyoon and Sohyun's contracts had expired on June 14 and that the members decided not to renew their contracts, hence their departure from Cube Entertainment. 
Since 4Minute's disbandment, Ji-hyun signed a new contract with Artist Company to pursue a career in acting.

In 2017, Ji-hyun starred in KBS' youth romance drama Strongest Deliveryman. In December 2017, Artist Company announced that she had changed her name to Son Ji-hyun.

In 2018, Ji-hyun starred in TV Chosun's historical drama Grand Prince.

In December 2021, Nam signed a contract with FN Entertainment.

In August 2022, Nam signed a contract with Urban Works.

Personal life 
She has a Pilates license.

Discography

Filmography

Film

Television series

Variety show

Awards and nominations

References

External links 

 Official Fancafe

4Minute members
Japanese-language singers
South Korean female idols
South Korean women pop singers
South Korean television personalities
South Korean female models
Actresses from Seoul
Singers from Seoul
1990 births
Living people
South Korean television actresses
South Korean film actresses
21st-century South Korean singers
21st-century South Korean women singers